UFC1 may refer to:

 Ubiquitin-fold modifier conjugating enzyme 1 (UFC1), a protein involved in the ufmylation cascade
 UFC 1, the first mixed martial arts event organized by the Ultimate Fighting Championship